Credit Union 1 is Alaska's only state-chartered credit union, and anyone who lives or works in Alaska is eligible to join. As of December 31, 2021, the credit union had $1.47 billion in assets, nearly 100,000 members and 12 branches throughout the state.

Based in Anchorage, Alaska, Credit Union1 is the second largest credit union in its state and the only one that solely serves Alaskans. As of 2022, the credit union currently employs nearly 425 Alaskans in communities ranging from Ketchikan, Alaska, to Nome, Alaska.

Credit Union1 is federally insured by the National Credit Union Administration (NCUA), up to $250,000 per account.

History
Credit Union 1 was established as the Anchorage Teachers Federal Credit Union in 1952. Its original base of membership was personnel and dependents of the Anchorage Independent School District. The credit union since merged with other Alaskan credit unions, such as FedAlaska, Ward Cove, Frontier Alaskan and North Country Credit Union, to form Credit Union1.

In 2010, the credit union opened a branch in the Mountain View neighborhood of Anchorage, which had not had a financial institution for over 20 years. The land for the new branch was purchased from the Anchorage Community Land Trust.

In 2016, Credit Union1 was named to The Financial Brand’s “Top 100" list of credit unions using social media.<ref>Top 100 Credit Unions Using Social Media. They have climbed the list steadily since then.</ref>

In 2021, the credit union was again recognized as one of the top 49 businesses in Alaska by Alaska Business MonthlyIn 2021, Credit Union 1 was again named among the top three Best Places to Work (250+ employees) in Alaska by Alaska Business Monthly''

References

External links
 

1952 establishments in Alaska
Anchorage School District
Banks established in 1952
Companies based in Anchorage, Alaska
Credit unions based in Alaska
Non-profit organizations based in Anchorage, Alaska